Force of Arms (reissued under the title A Girl for Joe) is a 1951 romantic war drama film set in the Italian theater of World War II. It reteamed William Holden and Nancy Olson in the third of their four movies together (Sunset Boulevard, Union Station, and Submarine Command being the others), all released in 1950 or 1951. An American infantryman on leave and a Women's Army Corps (WAC) officer fall in love.

Plot
After hard fighting in the Battle of San Pietro, the infantrymen of the American 36th Infantry Division are given five days of much needed rest. Sergeant Joe "Pete" Peterson meets WAC Lieutenant Eleanor "Ellie" MacKa in a cemetery. However, his attempts to become better acquainted are brushed off. Later, Pete's friend and commanding officer, Major Blackford, tells him he has been given a battlefield commission and is now a second lieutenant.

When Sergeant McFee becomes upset because he has not received a letter from his wife in a long time, Pete takes him to the post office to investigate and finds Ellie working there. This time, Ellie offers to buy Pete a drink in celebration of his promotion.  Although he agrees, she still tries to keep things from becoming serious, revealing that she almost married another soldier, except he was killed, and does not want to risk falling in love again. However, when the division's leave is cut short, she cannot stay away. Pete gets her to agree to marry him on his next leave.

Blackford assigns Pete and his platoon to take out a German roadblock. Pete spots two deadly German 88 guns commanding the road on which American tanks are advancing. However, when one of his men urges him to attack the guns, Pete rejects the idea; with Ellie on his mind, he has become overcautious. The 88s knock out the lead American tank, from which Blackford is directing the attack. The major is killed. Pete himself is wounded by an artillery barrage and wakes up in a hospital.

Blaming himself for his friend's death (even though he knows he could not have reached the guns in time anyway), Pete sinks into a depression, unwilling to see anyone. A visit from Ellie brings him out of it. Pete tells her that he has been given a three-day leave before being sent back to the United States, safely out of combat. Together out in the countryside, they get married. However, Pete's guilt makes him decide to rejoin his unit. Ellie does not try to stop him. Afterward, she discovers she is pregnant, which means she will have to leave the army.

Pete is hit when he reconnoiters ahead, and his men are ordered to retreat, leaving him behind. Unwilling to believe her husband is dead, Ellie searches everywhere for him without success. When Rome is liberated, she finally finds him; he had been taken prisoner, but was freed when the Germans retreated.

Cast
 William Holden as Sergeant/Lieutenant Joe "Pete" Peterson
 Nancy Olson as Lieutenant Eleanor MacKay
 Frank Lovejoy as Major Blackford
 Gene Evans as Sergeant Smiley "Mac" McFee
 Dick Wesson as Kleiner, one of Pete's men
 Paul Picerni as Sheridan
 Katherine Warren as Major Waldron, Eleanor's commander
 Ross Ford as Hooker
 Ron Hagerthy as Minto

References

External links
 
 
 
 

1950s war drama films
American romantic drama films
American war drama films
1950s English-language films
American black-and-white films
Films directed by Michael Curtiz
Films scored by Max Steiner
Italian Campaign of World War II films
Warner Bros. films
1951 romantic drama films
1951 films
Films set in 1943
Films set in 1944
1950s American films